Richard Bradshaw  (born 1938) is an internationally renowned Australian puppeteer.

Richard Bradshaw is a one time Artistic Director of the Marionette Theatre of Australia. He is a shadow puppeteer who also writes for puppets. In 2005, he was commissioned by Terrapin Puppet Theatre to write The Storyteller's Shadow: a Celebration of Hans Christian Andersen which toured around Tasmania, to Denmark and to Singapore and Malaysia. Jim Henson, a fellow puppeteer, featured the work of Bradshaw as part of a six-part television series on puppetry. His shadow puppets were used for animations and stories on Play School.

Bradshaw was awarded the Order of Australia Medal for services to puppetry and the performing arts.

References

Books and articles
 Benson, P.D., "Good Show, Super 'Roo", The Australian Women's Weekly, (Wednesday, 25 September 1974), p.113.

 Bradshaw, R.,"Norman Hetherington 1921 – 2010 (Eulogy)", O.P.E.N., No.11, (December 2010), pp.2–4.
 Camens, J. "The Mysterious Potamus", The Australian Women's Weekly, (Wednesday, 17 January 1979), p.17.
 Carr, V., "The Actor in the Wings", The Australian Women's Weekly, (Wednesday, 26 February 1969), p.7.

 Guss, Naomi, "Australian puppetry – Richard Bradshaw", School of Puppetry, 7 January, 2010.

Australian puppeteers
Living people
1938 births